The 486th Bombardment Squadron is an inactive United States Air Force unit.  Its last was assigned to the 22d Bombardment Wing, stationed at March Air Force Base, California.  It was inactivated on 1 July 1971.

History
Established as a B-25 Mitchell medium bomber squadron in mid-1942, trained by Third Air Force in the southeastern United States.  Deployed to IX Bomber Command in Egypt initially in March 1943 via Air Transport Command South Atlantic Route through Caribbean, Brazil, Liberia, Central Africa and Sudan, then reassigned to Mediterranean Theater of Operations (MTO), and to XII Bomber Command in Tunisia.   Supported Allied ground forces in Tunisian Campaign; participated in Invasions of Sicily and Italy during 1943, supporting Allied ground forces with tactical bombing of enemy targets.   Participated in liberation of Corsica during the spring of 1944, then returned to Italy engaging in attacks on enemy ground forces and targets in the Po Valley during the spring of 1945.

Personnel demobilized in Italy during summer of 1945; squadron returned to the United States, being prepared for deployment to Pacific Theater for use as a tactical bomb squadron in programmed Invasion of Japan.   Japanese capitulation led to squadron's inactivation in November 1945.

Activated as an A-26 Invader squadron in the postwar Air Force reserves in 1947; inactivated in 1949 due to budget reductions.

Reactivated in October 1952 as a Strategic Air Command B-47 Stratojet squadron.   Initially equipped with prototypes of the Boeing RB-47B Stratojet (YRB-47) to perform long-range photo-reconnaissance with a flight of Boeing B-29 Superfortress bombers assigned. In November 1953 began to receive production B-47E medium bomber aircraft; prototype reconnaissance aircraft already received exchanged for medium bomber versions. Participated in SAC REFLEX deployments to Europe and North Africa throughout the 1950s and 1960s.

In 1966 with the phaseout of the B-47 the aircraft sent to storage at Davis–Monthan and inactivated.  Became B-52D Heavy bombardment squadron with takeover of assets of the 325th Bombardment Squadron and transfer to Bergstrom AFB, Texas.   Stood nuclear alert until 1966 when SAC turned over Bergstrom to Tactical Air Command.

The 486th Bomb Squadron was transferred completely as a B-52D conventional bomb squadron to March AFB, California as part of the 22d Bombardment Wing in 1966.  Performed frequent rotations to Western Pacific, engaging in Arc Light strategic bombardment of enemy targets over Indochina as part of Vietnam War. 486th crews were the first to land B52's at, U-Tapao Royal Thai Navy Airfield. In 1970 it was permanently deployed to U-Tapao Royal Thai Navy Airfield and placed in provisional status.   Inactivated in 1971 due to budget reductions.

Lineage
 Constituted 486th Bombardment Squadron (Medium) on 10 August 1942
 Activated on 20 August 1942
 Inactivated on 7 November 1945
 Redesignated 486th Bombardment Squadron (Light) on 8 October 1947
 Activated in the reserve on 31 October 1947
 Inactivated on 19 August 1949
 Redesignated 486th Bombardment Squadron (Medium) on 3 October 1952
 Activated on 20 October 1952
 Inactivated on 1 September 1963
 Redesignated 486th Bombardment Squadron (Heavy) on 1 September 1963
 Organized on 1 September 1963, assuming personnel/equipment/aircraft of 335th Bombardment Squadron (Inactivated)
 Redesignated 486th Bombardment Squadron (Provisional) on 21 January 1970
 Inactivated on 1 July 1971
 Redesignated 486th Bombardment Squadron (Provisional) on 1 June 1972 and placed in provisional status.
 Unmanned / Not Operational 1 June 1972 – 15 November 1973.
 Inactivated and Discontinued on 15 November 1973

Assignments
 340th Bombardment Group, 20 August 1942 – 7 November 1945; 31 October 1947 – 19 August 1949
 340th Bombardment Wing, 20 October 1952 – 1 September 1963; 1 September 1963 – 1 October 1966
 22d Bombardment Wing, 2 October 1966
 Attached to: 307th Strategic Wing, 21 January 1970 – 1 July 1971
 Strategic Wing (Provisional), 72, 1 Jun 1972 – 15 Nov 1973

Stations

 Columbia AAB, South Carolina, 20 August 1942
 Walterboro, South Carolina 30 November 1942 – 30 January 1943
 RAF Kabrit, Egypt March 1943
 Medenine Airfield, Tunisia March 1943
 Sfax Airfield, Tunisia April 1943
 Hergla Airfield, Tunisia 2 June 1943
 Comiso Airfield, Sicily c. 2 August 1943
 Catania Airport, Sicily 27 August 1943
 San Pancrazio Airfield, Italy c. 15 October 1943
 Foggia Airfield, Italy 19 November 1943
 Pompeii Airfield, Italy c. 2 January 1944
 Gaudo Airfield, Italy 23 March 1944

 Alesan, Corsica, France c. 15 April 1944
 Rimini Airfield, Italy c. 7 April-16 July 1945
 Seymour Johnson Field, North Carolina 9 August 1945
 Columbia AAB, South Carolina 2 October – 7 November 1945
 Tulsa Municipal Airport, Oklahoma, 31 October 1947 – 19 August 1949
 Sedalia (later Whiteman) AFB, Missouri, 20 October 1952 – 1 September 1963
 Bergstrom AFB, Texas, 1 September 1963 – 1 October 1966
 March AFB, California, 2 October 1966 – 1 July 1971
 Deployed to: U-Tapao Royal Thai Navy Airfield, Thailand, 21 January 1970 – 1 July 1971
 Andersen Air Force Base, Guam, 1 Jun 1972 – 15 Nov 1973

Aircraft
 B-25 Mitchell, 1942–1945
 A-26 Invader, 1947–1949
 YRB-47 Stratojet, 1954–1955
 B-47 Stratojet, 1955–1962
 B-52D Stratofortress, 1963–1971
 B-52G Stratoforetress, 1972–1973

See also

 List of B-52 Units of the United States Air Force

References

External links
 'Our plane was on fire. We had to bail out'

Bombardment squadrons of the United States Air Force
Military units and formations in California
Bombardment squadrons of the United States Army Air Forces
Military units and formations established in 1942